Rajshekhar Kolur (born 31 December 1936) is an Indian politician who served as a Member of Parliament in 6th Lok Sabha from Raichur Lok Sabha constituency.

Early life and background 
Rajshekhar was born on 31 December 1936 in Rampur Village of Raichur district. Mallappa Kolur was his father. He completed schooling from Nrupathunga High School, Hyderabad, before going on to do his graduation in B.Com. and B.L. from Nizam College, Hyderabad, Osmania University, Hyderabad, and Bangalore University.

Personal life 
Rajshekhar Kolur married Smt. Shardamma Kolur on 21 April 1969. The couple has two sons and two daughters.

Position held

References 

Indian politicians
1936 births
India MPs 1977–1979
Lok Sabha members from Karnataka
Karnataka politicians
Indian National Congress politicians from Karnataka
Kannada people
People from Yadgir district
People from Kalaburagi
People from Raichur
People from Karnataka
Living people